Pymlicoe House is a grade II listed house in Hadley Green West, Monken Hadley, in the London Borough of Barnet. The house dates from the later 18th century and was probably stuccoed in the mid 19th century.

See also
Hadley Green

References

External links

http://www.rightmove.co.uk/property-for-sale/property-43127365.html
https://web.archive.org/web/20140306231714/http://search.savills.com/property-detail/gbnersbns130108
http://collage.cityoflondon.gov.uk/collage/app;jsessionid=85D3336A3D7D08BCED383ECAA3C1DDDA?service=external/Item&sp=Zlondon&sp=159901&sp=X
http://www.zoopla.co.uk/property-history/pymlicoe-house/hadley-green-west/barnet/en5-4pp/32048800
http://www.hertfordshire-genealogy.co.uk/data/answers/answers-2004/ans-0372-beavan.htm

Grade II listed buildings in the London Borough of Barnet
Monken Hadley